Disney's Hollywood Studios is a theme park at the Walt Disney World Resort in Bay Lake, Florida, near Orlando. It is owned and operated by The Walt Disney Company through its Parks, Experiences and Products division. Based on a concept by Marty Sklar, Randy Bright, and Michael Eisner, the park opened on May 1, 1989, as the Disney-MGM Studios (Theme) Park, and was the third of four theme parks built at Walt Disney World. Spanning , the park is dedicated to the imagined worlds from film, television, music, and theatre, drawing inspiration from the Golden Age of Hollywood.

Disney's Hollywood Studios was initially developed as both a theme park inspired by show business and an operating production studio, with active film and television production services, an animation facility branch, and a functioning backlot. Construction on the combined park and studio began in 1987, but was accelerated when the construction of the similarly-themed Universal Studios Florida began a few miles away. To increase public interest and the variety of film representation within the park, Disney entered into a licensing agreement with Metro-Goldwyn-Mayer (MGM), from which the park's original name was derived. The park's production facilities were removed throughout the 2000s, and many of the park's soundstages were retrofitted for newer attractions and guest use. The park's current name took effect in 2008, with the removal of the MGM-branding throughout the park. In the 2010s, the park began to distance itself from the original studio backlot intention and entered a new direction of immersive theming and attraction development inspired by imagined worlds from Hollywood storytellers.

The park's original icon was the Earffel Tower, a faux water tower topped with Mickey Mouse ears. In 2001, the Sorcerer's Hat—a stylized version of the magical hat from Fantasia—was erected in the park's central hub and served as the icon until its removal in January 2015. The Earffel Tower was also removed the following year. Since then, the Hollywood Tower Hotel has acted as the park's icon, with the Chinese Theatre serving as the visual centerpiece. In 2018, the park hosted 11.258 million guests, ranking it the fifth most-visited theme park in North America and the ninth most-visited theme park in the world.

Dedication

History

A team of Walt Disney Imagineers led by Marty Sklar and Randy Bright had been given an assignment to create two new pavilions for Epcot's Future World section. The brainstorming sessions led to Wonders of Life and Great Movie Ride pavilions. The latter was to look like a soundstage backdrop, with a movie theater-style entrance in the middle and would have sat between the Land and Journey Into Imagination pavilions. When newly appointed CEO Michael Eisner saw the plans for the pavilion, he requested that, instead of placing the ride in an already existing park, it should be the anchor for a new park themed with Hollywood, entertainment, and show business.

In 1985, Disney and Metro-Goldwyn-Mayer (MGM) entered into a licensing contract that gave Disney worldwide rights to use the MGM brand and logo for what would become Disney-MGM Studios, which included working production facilities for films and television shows, a backlot, and a satellite animation studio for Walt Disney Feature Animation, which began operation prior to the park's debut. In 1988, MGM/UA responded by filing a lawsuit that claimed Disney violated the agreement by operating a working movie and television studio at the resort. On May 1, 1989, the theme park opened adjacent to the production facilities, with MGM's only affiliation being the original licensing agreement that allowed Disney to use MGM's name and lion logo in marketing, and separate contracts that allowed specific MGM content to be used in the Great Movie Ride. On opening day, the only two operating attractions were the Studio Backlot Tour and the Great Movie Ride. Several months after park opening, the "Streetmosphere" improvisational troupe was added to the park. The Streetmosphere performers, now named the Citizens of Hollywood, are the longest-running attraction at the park.

Disney later filed a countersuit, claiming that MGM/UA and MGM Grand, Inc. had conspired to violate Disney's worldwide rights to the MGM name in the theme park business and that MGM/UA would harm Disney's reputation by building its own theme park at the MGM Grand hotel and casino in Las Vegas, Nevada. On October 23, 1992, Los Angeles Superior Court Judge Curtis B. Rappe ruled that Disney had the right to continue using the Disney-MGM Studios name on film product produced at the Florida facility, and that MGM Grand had the right to build a Las Vegas theme park using the MGM name and logo as long as it did not share the same studio backlot theme as Disney's property. The  MGM Grand Adventures Theme Park opened in 1993 at the Las Vegas site and closed permanently in 2000. Disney was contractually prohibited from using the Disney-MGM Studios name in certain marketing contexts; in those instances, the park was called either The Disney Studios or Disney Studios Florida.

In the 1990s, as the park's popularity and attendance grew, the park saw its first expansion in 1994, with the addition of Sunset Boulevard and The Twilight Zone Tower of Terror attraction. The backlot's New York streets were opened to guest access to relieve traffic and renamed as Streets of America. During that same decade, Walt Disney Feature Animation's on-site satellite studio assisted in the production of Beauty and the Beast, Aladdin, and The Lion King, with Mulan and Lilo & Stitch being completed entirely at the park's studio. In 2001, the Sorcerer's Hat—a stylized version of the magical hat from Fantasia—was erected in front of the park's Chinese Theater and began to serve as the park's icon from then onwards, displacing the Earffel Tower in that role. In 2004, Disney shuttered the Florida animation unit. The backlot's Residential Street was demolished to accommodate the new location for Lights, Motors, Action! Extreme Stunt Show in 2005. In 2007, Disney announced that Disney-MGM Studios would be rebranded as Disney's Hollywood Studios, effective January 7, 2008. That same year, the former Stage 1 soundstage became home to Toy Story Mania! and the surrounding area was rethemed as Pixar Place.

In the 2010s, Disney began phasing out the park's "studio-like" attractions that headlined the park during its early years of operation. This included the closure of the park's Studio Backlot Tour, American Idol Experience, and the Legend of Captain Jack Sparrow attractions in 2014. The following year, the Sorcerer's Hat was removed and the original sightlines from Hollywood Boulevard to the park's Chinese Theatre were restored. In March 2015, during an annual shareholders meeting, Disney CEO Bob Iger hinted at another possible name change for the park due to the changes coming in the near future. However, the company denied the rumors of a name change in February 2018. The park continued to close more studio-themed attraction; in April 2016, the majority of Streets of America—including the backlot street facades, the Lights, Motors, Action! Extreme Stunt Show, the Earffel Tower, and the remaining backstage areas—was closed and demolished in preparation for Star Wars: Galaxy's Edge and Toy Story Land. In 2017, the Great Movie Ride closed as the final remaining opening-day attraction and was replaced by Mickey & Minnie's Runaway Railway.

The park was closed from March 16 to July 15, 2020, due to the COVID-19 pandemic in Florida.

Park layout and attractions

Disney's Hollywood Studios is divided into seven themed areas inspired by fantasized iterations of either existing locations found in Hollywood and Los Angeles or imagined worlds from Hollywood stories. The park's original layout featured a large Hidden Mickey, which was visible in aerial photographs of the park and on the park's early guide maps, though construction and other park changes have eliminated much of this image.

Hollywood Boulevard

Hollywood Boulevard, inspired by the real street of the same name, serves as the park's main entrance and operates in the same vein as Main Street, U.S.A. at Magic Kingdom. It is lined with themed streetscape facades and venues selling Disney merchandise and park services. Guests enter through the main entrance gate, which resembles the Pan-Pacific Auditorium. Near the park's gate is a recreation of the Crossroads of the World tower. Live street entertainment and seasonal parades travel down the main street throughout the day. At the far end of Hollywood Boulevard stands an exact replica of Grauman's Chinese Theatre, which houses Mickey and Minnie's Runaway Railway, a dark ride themed to the world of Mickey Mouse animated shorts. Near the entrance of Animation Courtyard—resides The Hollywood Brown Derby restaurant, a themed replica of the original Brown Derby restaurant in Hollywood, California.

Echo Lake

Echo Lake, inspired by the similarly-named neighborhood in Los Angeles, is designed to mimic the suburban "California Crazy" form of architecture from Hollywood's Golden Age and is anchored around the area's namesake lake.

Echo Lake includes three major attractions based on characters and films created by George Lucas and produced by Lucasfilm. Star Tours – The Adventures Continue is a 3-D motion simulator ride set in the Star Wars universe. The Jedi Training: Trials of the Temple, a live-action stage show, invites children to become "padawan learners" and receive lightsaber training from a Jedi master. The live-action Indiana Jones Epic Stunt Spectacular! re-enacts various scenes from Steven Spielberg's Raiders of the Lost Ark, while illustrating how professional film stunts are performed.

The Hyperion Theater houses For the First Time in Forever: A Frozen Sing-Along Celebration, a musical show based on Disney's 2013 animated film Frozen. Behind this building lies a subsection named Commissary Lane, that connects Hollywood Boulevard directly to Grand Avenue and bypasses Echo Lake altogether. In this area, resides the ABC Commissary and the Sci-Fi Dine-In Theater Restaurant, a dinner theater with a retro-style theme featuring vintage car themed tables and a large movie screen featuring continuous clips of science-fiction films from the 1950s.

Grand Avenue

Grand Avenue is themed as a gentrified historic district inspired by the real location of the same name in downtown Los Angeles. The area is anchored by Muppet*Vision 3D, a 4D film attraction starring the Muppets from Jim Henson's The Muppet Show, that is presented at the Grand Arts Theatre within the avenue's Grand Park, itself also inspired by the real park of the same name. Grand Avenue is also home to PizzeRizzo—a Brooklyn-style pizza restaurant owned by Rizzo the Rat—Mama Melrose's Ristorante Italiano, and BaseLine Tap House, a modern California-styled pub. The main street of Grand Avenue leads into a recreation of a Figueroa Street Tunnel which connects to Star Wars: Galaxy's Edge.

Grand Avenue was originally planned as a themed area called Muppet Studios, following Disney's acquisition of the Jim Henson Company. In addition to Muppet*Vision 3D, this area was to include a themed restaurant and a Muppet dark ride parody of The Great Movie Ride. The deal fell through after Henson's death, and only Muppet*Vision 3D was developed.

The realized Muppet-themed section became a part of the park's former Streets of America area, which encompassed several attractions, including an urban street amalgamation of New York City and San Francisco. The area's namesake street facades were formerly the park's working backlot set, which was originally a component of the park's inaugural Studio Backlot Tour, and opened to pedestrian park traffic in the mid-1990s; this area closed on April 2, 2016. The Muppet-themed areas and a single remaining New York block of the Streets of America facades were repurposed into Muppets Courtyard, which served as a placeholder designation until Grand Avenue was completed in September 2017.

Star Wars: Galaxy's Edge

Star Wars: Galaxy's Edge is set within the Star Wars universe, at the Black Spire Outpost village on the remote frontier planet of Batuu. Attractions include Star Wars: Rise of the Resistance, a dark ride that places guests in a climactic battle between the First Order and the Resistance; and Millennium Falcon: Smugglers Run, a flying simulator attraction that allows guests to pilot the Millennium Falcon through a customized secret mission on behalf of Hondo Ohnaka and Chewbacca. Restaurants and shops include Oga's Cantina, Savi's Workshop, and the Droid Depot. The land opened in 2019, replacing the park's Streets of America section. The  area cost an estimated $1 billion.

Toy Story Land

Toy Story Land is inspired by Pixar's Toy Story series. The  area is themed to Andy's backyard with three attractions, each hosted by characters from the series. The attractions include Toy Story Mania!, an interactive 4D attraction inspired by classic carnival midway games; Slinky Dog Dash, an outdoor roller coaster; and Alien Swirling Saucers, a spinning teacup ride. The land opened on June 30, 2018.

Toy Story Mania! was originally a standalone attraction within Pixar Place, an area dedicated to films and characters created by Pixar, resembling the animation studio's Emeryville, California campus. Pixar Place was also the home of Luxo Jr., a six-foot-tall audio-animatronic version of Pixar's desk-lamp mascot. The moving character performed periodic shows throughout the day and evening across from Toy Story Midway Mania.

Animation Courtyard

Animation Courtyard is home to attractions based on films and characters created by Walt Disney Animation Studios. Its entrance is marked by a square "studio arch". This section of the park originally was the starting point for the Studio Backlot Tour.

The former Magic of Disney Animation building hosts Star Wars Launch Bay, a Star Wars exhibit featuring behind-the-scenes props and character meet-and-greets with Darth Vader, Chewbacca, and BB-8. Mickey Avenue, a subsection of Animation Courtyard, is home to a walk-through exhibit, Walt Disney Presents, which explores the life and legacy of Walt Disney through photos, models, artifacts, and a short biographical film narrated by Julie Andrews. The Courtyard section also hosts two live shows. Disney Junior Dance Party! entertains guests with characters from Disney Junior series, including Mickey and the Roadster Racers, Vampirina, Doc McStuffins, and The Lion Guard. Across the plaza, Voyage of the Little Mermaid uses glow-in-the-dark puppets, lasers, music, projectors, human actors and water effects to recreate favorite scenes and songs from the 1989 animated film.

Sunset Boulevard

Sunset Boulevard, inspired by the real thoroughfare of the same name, as well as the film of the same name, was the first expansion of the park, opening in July 1994. The focal point of Sunset Boulevard is The Twilight Zone Tower of Terror, a thrill ride based on Rod Serling's The Twilight Zone. Located nearby is Rock 'n' Roller Coaster Starring Aerosmith, an indoor darkened roller coaster themed to the music of Aerosmith, with three inversions and a high-speed launch.

Sunset Boulevard has two outdoor amphitheaters, and one indoor theater. The covered Theater of the Stars hosts Beauty and the Beast Live on Stage, a stage show featuring highlights from the animated film. The larger open-air Hollywood Hills Amphitheater is the home of Fantasmic!, a nighttime show featuring Mickey Mouse and many other Disney characters in a story with fireworks, lasers and water effects. The completely indoor Sunset Showcase hosts Lightning McQueen's Racing Academy, and features Lightning McQueen and other Cars characters teaching "rookie racers" about the lessons they've learned when racing.

Live entertainment

Disney's Hollywood Studios has featured numerous forms of in-park entertainment throughout its history. During its early years, the park featured the "Star Today" program, with a daily celebrity guest. The celebrity would often be featured in a motorcade along Hollywood Boulevard or would take part in a handprint ceremony at the Great Movie Ride's entrance, or participate in an interview session.

At other times, Disney has imported characters and intellectual properties that were not part of its own original library of films and television shows. Some of these characters have included the Teenage Mutant Ninja Turtles, Ace Ventura, Pet Detective, and characters from the Goosebumps series by author R. L. Stine. The Mighty Morphin Power Rangers made appearances in the park during the first seasons of the television series but then vanished. Disney had ownership of the Power Rangers franchise through its purchase of Saban Entertainment until May 2010 when Saban purchased the franchise back and were regular members of the park's cast of characters during that time. Live musical acts, such as the cover band Mulch, Sweat and Shears and the a cappella quartet Four For a Dollar, used to perform on the park streets or as pre-show entertainment at the larger shows.

Like Disney's Animal Kingdom, Disney's Hollywood Studios also used to run daily parades down Hollywood Boulevard. The Disney Stars and Motor Cars Parade and the Pixar Block Party Bash featured film characters performing in a street party along Hollywood Boulevard and near Echo Lake. Several times each day, the "High School Musical 3 Senior Year: Right Here Right Now" show used to travel Hollywood Boulevard before performing a live street show in front of the Sorcerer's Hat.

Streetmosphere performers have been present at Disney's Hollywood Studios since 1989. They are the only opening day attraction left in the park. The improv troupe was originally called Streetmosphere, but later renamed to the Citizens of Hollywood. They perform magic, skits, and interact with guests multiple times a day on Sunset Boulevard and Hollywood Boulevard.

Annual events

Disney's Hollywood Studios has hosted several events during the years that often draw thousands of fans to the park.

There have also been four former events:
ESPN The Weekend (late winter) featured commentators from the Disney-owned cable sports channels as well as sports celebrities. The event was started in 2004 and permanently cancelled in July 2011.
Star Wars Weekends (May–June) brought Star Wars fans and celebrities together for special park events. Running Fridays-Sundays throughout June, they featured the 501st Legion (a worldwide Star Wars costuming group) parading through the park in costumes that include Stormtroopers, TIE fighter pilots, biker scouts and Rebel soldiers. Several Star Wars actors appear each weekend for photos and autographs, appearing in a variety of shows hosted in the various theatres around the park, larger Jedi Training Academy classes for younger guests, and other activities. Star Wars Weekends ended its run in 2015.
ABC Super Soap Weekend was scheduled in November, the event paid tribute to the legions of fans of soap operas from ABC. Guests could meet stars from All My Children, One Life to Live, and General Hospital. The event's final presentation was in November 2008, with ABC instead planning to schedule multiple, smaller regional events around the country for its fans.
The Osborne Family Spectacle of Dancing Lights (November–January) took over the Streets of America during the Christmas season. The event ended its run in 2015.

Production history

The Walt Disney Company's original concept of the Disney-MGM Studios was to operate it as a television and motion picture production facility, as well as a theme park. In 1988, among the first feature-length movies filmed at the facility, prior to its completion and opening as a theme park, were Ernest Saves Christmas and Newsies.

When the park opened in 1989, the studio/production facilities housed two major components, the first of which was Walt Disney Feature Animation Florida, where Disney produced projects including Mulan, Lilo & Stitch, Brother Bear, and sequences from other 1990s-early 2000s Disney animated features. The second, larger component was Walt Disney Studios Florida, which consisted of three sound stages used for Disney projects including The Disney Channel's Mickey Mouse Club, Teen Win, Lose or Draw and Adventures in Wonderland. Several third party productions also used the Studios, including Superboy (first season only, from 1988–1989), the 1988–89 season of MTV's Remote Control, Thunder in Paradise, a revival of Let's Make a Deal, special broadcasts of Wheel of Fortune, airplane interior sequences for the feature film Passenger 57, and The Dooley and Pals Show. Music videos, several tapings for World Championship Wrestling (WCW), and live broadcasts of WCW Monday Nitro were also shot there; see WCW Disney tapings. The Post Group had a Florida-based post-production facility located on the Studio lot throughout the 1990s. All these production and post-production facilities were constructed to be an integral part of the theme park's Backstage Studio Tour as well.

In 2004, Disney management (including CEO Michael Eisner) downsized Disney's Florida operations by closing the animation studio, laying off personnel and then moving the operations to the main animation studio in Burbank, California. A radio studio is also located on the lot, behind "Sounds Dangerous".

Attendance

See also
 Incidents at Walt Disney World Resort
 Walt Disney Studios Park, sister park at Disneyland Paris

References

External links

Conception of Disney's Hollywood Studios at Disney D23

 
Walt Disney World
1989 establishments in Florida
Amusement parks in Greater Orlando
Hollywood Studios
Disney production studios
World Championship Wrestling
Backlot sets
Amusement parks opened in 1989

pt:Walt Disney World Resort#Disney-Hollywood Studios